This article gives an overview of the woodland and scrub communities in the British National Vegetation Classification system.

Introduction
The woodland and scrub communities of the NVC were described in Volume 1 of British Plant Communities, first published in 1991.

In total, 25 woodland/scrub communities have been identified, consisting of 19 woodland communities, four communities classed as scrub and 2 as underscrub. 

The woodland communities consist of:
 Six mixed deciduous or oak/birch woodland communities, which between them are found throughout Britain
 Three Beech woodland communities, found mainly in southern England
 A Yew woodland community, almost completely restricted to southeast England (community W13)
 A Scots Pine woodland community, restricted to Scotland
 A Juniper woodland community (community W19)
 Seven wet woodland communities, characterised by the presence of alder, birch and willows (communities W1, W2, W3, W4, W5, W6 and W7).
 Communities of arctic-alpine willows

The scrub communities consist of:
 Communities consisting of shrubs such as hawthorn, blackthorn and elder
 Gorse and broom scrub

The underscrub communities consist of bramble and bracken underscrub.

A further scrub community, SD18, dominated by Sea Buckthorn, is classified among the sand-dune communities.

List of woodland and scrub communities
The following is a list of the communities that make up this category:
 W1 Salix cinerea - Galium palustre woodland
 W2 Salix cinerea - Betula pubescens - Phragmites australis woodland
 W3 Salix pentandra - Carex rostrata woodland
 W4 Betula pubescens - Molinia caerulea woodland
 W5 Alnus glutinosa - Carex paniculata woodland
 W6 Alnus glutinosa - Urtica dioica woodland
 W7 Alnus glutinosa - Fraxinus excelsior - Lysimachia nemorum woodland
 W8 Fraxinus excelsior - Acer campestre - Mercurialis perennis woodland
 W9 Fraxinus excelsior - Sorbus aucuparia - Mercurialis perennis woodland
 W10 Quercus robur - Pteridium aquilinum - Rubus fruticosus woodland
 W11 Quercus petraea - Betula pubescens - Oxalis acetosella woodland
 W12 Fagus sylvatica - Mercurialis perennis woodland
 W13 Taxus baccata woodland
 W14 Fagus sylvatica - Rubus fruticosus woodland
 W15 Fagus sylvatica - Deschampsia flexuosa woodland
 W16 Quercus spp. - Betula spp. - Deschampsia flexuosa woodland
 W17 Quercus petraea - Betula pubescens - Dicranum majus woodland
 W18 Pinus sylvestris - Hylocomium splendens woodland
 W19 Juniperus communis ssp. communis - Oxalis acetosella woodland
 W20 Salix lapponum - Luzula sylvatica scrub
 W21 Crataegus monogyna - Hedera helix scrub
 W22 Prunus spinosa - Rubus fruticosus scrub
 W23 Ulex europaeus - Rubus fruticosus scrub
 W24 Rubus fruticosus - Holcus lanatus underscrub
 W25 Pteridium aquilinum - Rubus fruticosus underscrub

Reference

Handbook

National Vegetation Classification: Users' handbook - JNCC Open Data by JS Rodwell · 2006

Other Websites

NERC Open Research Archive

The UK Woodland Assurance Standard (UKWAS) is an independent certification standard for verifying sustainable woodland management in the UK that is used for both Forest Stewardship Council® (FSC®) and the Programme for the Endorsement of Forest Certification (PEFC) certification.
TREE SPECIES AND PROVENANCE

See also

 John S. Rodwell